Fuerza de Gravedad is the tenth studio album of Puerto Rican singer Ednita Nazario. It was released in 1989.

Track listing
 "Fuerza De Gravedad"
 "Aprenderé"
 "De Todos Modos" (with Russell Hitchcock)
 "Operadora"
 "Lo Mejor De Tí"
 "Mi Corazón Tiene Mente Propia"
 "No Te Enamores De Mí"
 "Contigo Mi Amor"
 "Música Eléctrica"
 "Antes Y Después De Tí"

Singles
 Aprenderé
 De Todos Modos
 Mi Corazón Tiene Mente Propia
 Contigo Mi Amor
 Lo Mejor De Ti

Personnel
 Produced by Joe Lamont and Ednita Nazario

Ednita Nazario albums
1989 albums